This is a list detailing the electoral history of the Conservative Party in New York, specifically that related to the United States House of Representatives, sorted by year.  The list currently consists of candidates who ran for partisan office, either those who ran on the Conservative Party label or were endorsed by the party. In the case of endorsements, the vote tallied is that which the candidate received under that label.

U.S. House of Representatives

District 1

District 2

District 3

District 4

District 5

District 6

District 7

District 8

District 9

District 10

District 11

District 12

District 13

District 14

District 15

District 16

District 17

District 18

District 19

District 20

District 21

District 22

District 23

References

Election results by party in the United States